This is a list of airlines currently operating in Marshall Islands.

Aviation in the Marshall Islands
Marshall Islands
Marshall Islands

Airlines
Airlines